The Moment is a 1979 Romanian drama film directed by Gheorghe Vitanidis. It competed at the 11th Moscow International Film Festival.

Cast
 Violeta Andrei
 Leopoldina Bălănuță
 Gheorghe Cozorici
 Ion Dichiseanu
 
 Sebastian Papaiani
 
 Margareta Pogonat
 Mitică Popescu

References

External links
 

1979 films
1979 drama films
1970s Romanian-language films
Films directed by Gheorghe Vitanidis
Romanian drama films